Kim Hyung-suk (born July 6, 1920) is a South Korean retired philosopher and best-selling author of books including Solitude (1960) and The Discourse between Eternity and Love (1961) which had a significant impact in the young generation of South Koreans growing up in the tumultuous times during the South Korean history. He turned 100 in July 2020.

References 

1920 births
Living people
Men centenarians
South Korean centenarians
South Korean philosophers